The Forest Seasons is the third studio album by Finnish melodic death metal band Wintersun. It was released on July 21, 2017 via Nuclear Blast. The band cited Antonio Vivaldi's violin concerto The Four Seasons as an inspiration for the album title.

Track listing

Personnel
Credits:

Band members 
 Jari Mäenpää – lead vocals, all instruments, samples and orchestrations (Credited as Winter)
 Teemu Mäntysaari – backing vocals, growling shouts, choirs (Credited as Spring)
 Jukka Koskinen – low growling vocals, backing vocals, choirs (Credited as Autumn)

Production, credits 
 Produced by Jari Mäenpää
 Music: Jari Mäenpää 
 Lyrics: Jari Mäenpää
 All arrangements by Jari Mäenpää
 Vocals: Jari Mäenpää 
 Additional low growling vocals: Jukka Koskinen 
 Additional growling shouts: Teemu Mäntysaari 
 3-man Choir on the 'Awaken From The Dark Slumber (Spring)' by Jari Mäenpää, Teemu Mäntysaari and Jukka Koskinen
 Guitars, drums, bass, synthesizers, samples, and orchestrations: Jari Mäenpää
 Engineer: Jari Mäenpää 
 Recorded by Jari Mäenpää 
 Mixed by Jari Mäenpää 
 Mastered by Jari Mäenpää
 Album cover: Gyula Havancsák and Jari Mäenpää (hjules.com) 
 Album booklet and photos: Jari Mäenpää 
 Wintersun logo: Ritual (nucleart.com)

The Forest Expendables Choir on "The Forest That Weeps (Summer)" 
 Teemu Mäntysaari (Wintersun) 
 Jukka Koskinen (Wintersun) 
 Heri Joensen (Tyr) 
 Markus Toivonen (Ensiferum) 
 Jukka-Pekka Miettinen (Kirkkokahvit & Atmosphere Enterprise) 
 Mathias Nygård (Turisas) 
 Olli Vänskä (Turisas) 
 Perttu Vänskä (Scoring Helsinki) 
 Jussi Wickström (Turisas) 
 Kasper Mårtenson (Turisas) 
 Jesper Anastasiadis (Turisas) 
 Aleksi Sihvonen (Medicated) 
 Daniel Freyberg (Children of Bodom & Naildown) 
 Micko Hell (Denigrate & Gloomy Grim) 
 Mikko Salovaara 
 Mitja Harvilahti (Moonsorrow)

Charts

References

External links
 "The Forest Seasons" album on YouTube
 

2017 albums
Wintersun albums
Nuclear Blast albums
Concept albums